Joseph Repya (born 1946) is a Minnesota Independence Party politician, and a retired lieutenant colonel in the U.S. Army.

Repya served as an infantry rifle platoon leader during the Vietnam War from 1970 to 1971. He later served as a helicopter pilot during Operation Desert Shield/Storm from 1990 to 1991. After retiring, Repya came out of retirement and returned to active duty from 2004 to 2006, at the age of 59 he served in Baghdad, Iraq in Operation Iraqi Freedom in 2005.

Repya has been active in Minnesota politics for some time. In 2003, he distributed 30,000 Support Our Troop lawn signs and organized demonstrations in support of the U.S. military. He served as a delegate from Minnesota to the Republican National Convention in 2004 and 2008, and in 2007 ran unsuccessfully for chair of the Minnesota Republican Party. He left the party in June 2009, saying the party had become "dysfunctional." He was a candidate for the Independence Party nomination for Governor of Minnesota in 2010, withdrawing before the primary.

Repya is married to Deb, an attorney, and has two grown daughters and one granddaughter.

References

1946 births
Living people
Minnesota Republicans
United States Army aviators
Military personnel from Minnesota
Independence Party of Minnesota politicians
United States Army personnel of the Gulf War
United States Army personnel of the Iraq War